This is a list of significant Japanese poetry anthologies.

Waka 

Nara period chronicles (710 to 794)
Man'yōshū the oldest anthology in Japanese, c.785, 20 manuscript scrolls, 4,516 poems (when the tanka envoys to the various chōka are numbered as separate poems), Ōtomo no Yakamochi was probably the last to edit the Man'yōshū. It is not organized in any particular way (most metadata is supplied by headnotes), and the poems are written in a Japanese version of the Chinese monosyllabic pronunciation for the Chinese characters.

Heian period (794 to 1185)
Imperial waka anthologies: anthologies as a national project. Each anthology reflected the taste of time and with loyal dignity became canons for contemporaries and those who followed. The earliest three anthologies are often called Sandaishū, Three Major Anthologies, and earliest eight Hachidaishū, Eight Major Anthologies. Twenty one Imperial anthologies were created: they are collectively known as the Nijūichidaishū.
Kokin Wakashū the first imperial waka anthology, 20 scrolls, 1,111 poems, ordered by Emperor Daigo and completed c. 905, compiled by Ki no Tsurayuki, Ki no Tomonori, Ōshikōchi no Mitsune and Mibu no Tadamine.
Gosen Wakashū 20 scrolls, 1,426 poems, ordered in 951 by Emperor Murakami
Shūi Wakashū 20 scrolls, 1,351 poems, ordered by ex-Emperor Kazan
Goshūi Wakashū 20 scrolls, approx 1,200 poems, Ordered in 1075 by Emperor Shirakawa, completed in 1086.
Kin'yō Wakashū 10 scrolls, 716 poems, ordered by former Emperor Shirakawa, drafts completed 1124–1127, compiled by Minamoto no Shunrai (Toshiyori)
Shika Wakashū 10 scrolls, 411 poems, ordered in 1144 by former Emperor Sutoku, completed c. 1151–1154, compiled by Fujiwara Akisuke (:ja:藤原顕輔)
Senzai Wakashū 20 scrolls, 1,285 poems, ordered by former Emperor Go-Shirakawa, probably completed in 1188, compiled by Fujiwara no Shunzei (also known as Toshinari)
Shin Kokin Wakashū the eighth imperial waka anthology. Its name apparently aimed to show the relation and counterpart to Kokin Wakashū, ordered in 1201 by former Emperor Go-Toba, compiled by Fujiwara no Teika (whose first name is sometimes romanized as Sadaie), Fujiwara Ariie (:ja:藤原有家), Fujiwara no Ietaka (Karyū), the priest Jakuren, Minamoto Michitomo (:ja:堀川通具), and Asukai Masatsune
Private editions - Most of waka poets have their own anthology edited by self or by another. They were one of sources of the imperial anthologies.
Hitomarokashū An anthology of Kakinomoto no Hitomaro works. The editor is unknown. Perhaps edited in the early Heian period. Many misattributed waka are included.
Tsurayukishū An anthology of Ki no Tsurayuki works, one of editors of Kokin Wakashū.
Kintōshū An anthology of Fujiwara no Kintō, the editor of Wakan Rōeishū. It gave influence to the waka poetry in the middle Heian period.
Hyakunin Isshu, or more precisely Ogura Hyakunin Isshu. Edited by Fujiwara no Teika. Till Meiji it had been read as elementary book for waka poets.
Fujiwara no Teika Kashū An anthology of Fujiwara no Teika works.
Izumi Shikibu Shū

Kamakura period (1185–1333) and Muromachi period (1336–1573) 
Imperial anthologies - thirteen anthologies were edited mostly in the Kamakura period.
9. Shinchokusen Wakashū
10. Shokugosen Wakashū
11. Shokukokin Wakashū
12. Shokushūi Wakashū
13. Shingosen Wakashū
14. Gyokuyō Wakashū
15. Shokusenzai Wakashū
16. Shokugoshūi Wakashū
17. Fūga Wakashū
18. Shinsenzai Wakashū
19. Shinshūi Wakashū
20. Shingoshūi Wakashū
21. Shinshokukokin Wakashū

Renga 
Renri Hishō (c. 1349), a treatise on renga poetics by Nijō Yoshimoto
Tsukubashū (1356) edited by Nijō Yoshimoto. Given the status of imperial anthology after compilation.
Shinsentsukubashū (1470) Edited by Sōgi.

Haikai and Haiku 
Shinseninutsukubashū (1532) Edited by Yamazaki Sōkan. The significant anthology of early haikai renga from which haiku later developed.
 Kai Ōi (The Seashell Game). 1672 hokku anthology, compiled by Matsuo Bashō
Haikai Shichibushū The conventional name for seven anthologies collecting Matsuo Bashō and his disciples' renku.
Fuyunohi (A Winter Day)
Harunohi (A Spring Day)
Arano (Wilderness)
Hisago　(Gourd)
Sarumino (Monkey's Straw Raincoat)
Sumidawara (Carbon Carton)
Zokusarumino (Monkey's Straw Raincoat II)

Kanshi 
Kaifūsō (751) the oldest collection of Chinese poetry (kanshi) written by Japanese poets
Imperial anthologies - Advancing the Imperial waka anthologies, the earliest imperial anthologies gathered Kanshi, the Chinese poetry which Japanese learned from the Tang Dynasty. Three anthologies were edited in the early Heian period:
Ryōunshū
Bunka Shūreishū
Keikokushū

Miscellaneous 
Wakan rōeishū A collection of waka and kanshi for reciting. Compiled by Fujiwara no Kintō.

See also
 Fūyō Wakashū, late 13th century, sponsorship uncertain
 List of Japanese language poets
 List of Japanese classic texts
 Japanese poetry
 List of poetry anthologies
 List of National Treasures of Japan (writings)

Japanese poetry anthologies